Glenshee Ski Centre is an alpine snowsports area in the Scottish Highlands. It is located above the Cairnwell Pass at the head of Glen Shee on either side of the A93 road between Blairgowrie and Braemar. Glenshee is Britain's largest alpine snowsports area and is referred to as the 'Scottish Three Glens'. in reference to Les Trois Vallées.

There are 3 chairlifts, 3 T-bar lifts and 16 button lifts, mostly Pomas. A 4-seat chairlift is planned to replace the Cairnwell T-bar.

The pistes are spread across four mountains. The western side of the ski area is a large bowl encompassing The Cairnwell  and Càrn Aosda . The eastern side extends onto Meall Odhar  and Glas Maol . There are 8 green pistes; 13 blue; 13 red and 2 black including the 'Tiger', one of the steepest pistes in Scotland.

Extensive snow-making often allows the slopes to remain open in poor weather longer than other ski areas in Scotland.
The ski area is served by panoramic webcams.

References

External links
 Official site
 Snow report on Winterhighland

Ski areas and resorts in Scotland
Tourist attractions in Aberdeenshire